Takinami Dam is a rockfill dam located in Fukui Prefecture in Japan. The dam is used for flood control. The catchment area of the dam is 7.5 km2. The dam impounds about 9  ha of land when full and can store 577 thousand cubic meters of water. The construction of the dam was started on 1978 and completed in 1986.

References

Dams in Fukui Prefecture
1986 establishments in Japan